"She's Got It All" is a song written by Craig Wiseman and Drew Womack and recorded by American country music artist Kenny Chesney. It was released in May 1997 as the first single from Chesney’s 1997 album I Will Stand. The song became Chesney's first number one hit on the US Billboard Hot Country Singles & Tracks chart.

Chart positions

Year-end charts

Certifications

References

1997 singles
Kenny Chesney songs
Songs written by Craig Wiseman
Song recordings produced by Buddy Cannon
Song recordings produced by Norro Wilson
BNA Records singles
1997 songs